Batalden is a group of islands in the Vestland county of Norway.

Islands of Vestland
Kinn